Pigmy Deposit Scheme is a monetary deposit scheme introduced by Syndicate Bank, India .

Money in amounts as small as five rupees can be deposited into an account on a daily basis, by a bank agent collecting the money from the account holder's doorstep. The scheme was introduced to help daily wage earners, small traders and farmers begin saving, as a means to fund their bigger capital requirements such as weddings or purchases of homes or vehicles.

See also 
 Tonse Madhav Ananth Pai

External links 
 Syndicate Bank

Banking in India